Ifoghas may refer to:

Adrar des Ifoghas, a sandstone massif in Mali's Kidal Region
Kel Adagh (Kel Ifoghas), a confederation of Tuareg clans